Pseudovanilla, commonly known as giant climbing orchids, is a genus of eight climbing orchids in the family Orchidaceae. Orchids in this genus have tall climbing stems with clinging roots, leaf-like bracts and branching flowering stems with colourful, spreading sepals and petals. Species in the genus are native to Indonesia, the Philippines, New Guinea, Australia, Solomons, Micronesia and Fiji.

List of species
The following is a list of species of Pseudovanilla recognised by the World Checklist of Selected Plant Families as at November 2020:
 Pseudovanilla affinis (J.J.Sm.) Garay (1986) - Java
 Pseudovanilla anomala (Ames & L.O.Williams) Garay (1986) - Fiji 
 Pseudovanilla foliata (F.Muell.) Garay (1986) - Queensland, New South Wales, New Guinea
 Pseudovanilla gracilis (Schltr.) Garay (1986) - New Guinea, Solomon Islands
 Pseudovanilla montigena (Schltr.) Ormerod (2001) - New Guinea
 Pseudovanilla philippinensis (Ames) Garay (1986) - Luzon
 Pseudovanilla ponapensis (Kaneh. & Yamam.) Garay (1986) - Pohnpei
 Pseudovanilla ternatensis (J.J.Sm.) Garay (1986) - Ternate Island

References

  (1986) Botanical Museum Leaflets 30: 234.

External links

Vanilloideae genera